Purchas is a surname. Notable people with the surname include:

Guyon Purchas (1862–1940), Australian architect
John Purchas (1823–1872), English Anglican priest
Samuel Purchas (c. 1577 – 1626), English Anglican priest and writer
Sir Francis Purchas (19 June 1919 – 9 September 2003), English judge.